Joe Woods (born June 25, 1970) is an American football coach who is the defensive coordinator for the New Orleans Saints of the National Football League (NFL). A coaching veteran of 26 years, Woods has previously served as an assistant coach for the San Francisco 49ers, Denver Broncos, Oakland Raiders, Minnesota Vikings and Tampa Bay Buccaneers, as well as defensive coordinator for the Cleveland Browns.

College career
Woods lettered four times as a cornerback and safety during his collegiate career at Illinois State University, graduating from the school in 1992 with a degree in criminal justice. He was team captain as a senior in 1991 and went on to earn first-team All-Gateway Conference honors following his final season.

Coaching career

Early years

Woods began his coaching career as a defensive backs coach at Muskingum College in 1992 and moved on to become a graduate assistant coach at Eastern Michigan University in 1993. Woods also served as defensive backs coach at Kent State University (1997) and Grand Valley State University (1994-96) following a stint coaching linebackers during the spring of 1994 at Northwestern State University. He coached the same position with Hofstra University from 1998 to 2000, helping the school make consecutive trips to the 1-AA playoff quarterfinals. Woods then became the defensive backs coach for three seasons (2001-03) at Western Michigan University.

NFL

Tampa Bay Buccaneers

In 2004, Woods was hired by the Tampa Bay Buccaneers as the defensive backs coach. During his first two seasons with Tampa Bay, Woods coached a talented secondary led by cornerbacks Ronde Barber and Brian Kelly. Barber, an NFL 2000s All-Decade performer, earned first-team All-Pro recognition from the Associated Press following each of his two seasons playing for Woods.

Minnesota Vikings

Woods was brought to Minnesota in 2006 along with Defensive Coordinator Mike Tomlin, who worked with him as a secondary coach in Tampa Bay. Woods spent eight seasons coaching defensive backs in Minnesota. The Vikings finished among the NFL's top 10 defenses in four of his first five years with the team, capturing back-to-back NFC North Division titles from 2008 to 2009 and making an NFC Championship Game appearance following the 2009 season.

Oakland Raiders

Woods coached the Raiders’ defensive backs in 2014, working with veteran safety Charles Woodson, who led the team with 160 tackles (105 solo) and four interceptions in his 17th NFL season.

Denver Broncos

In Woods’ first season coaching the Broncos’ secondary in 2015, Denver finished first in the NFL against the pass (199.6 ypg) while the defensive backfield accounted for 11 interceptions, 56 passes defensed, nine forced fumbles and four touchdowns. The Broncos posted three interceptions against just one passing touchdown allowed during Denver's postseason run that ended with a victory in Super Bowl 50. In 2016, the Broncos’ secondary held opponents to the fewest yards per game (185.8), yards per attempt (5.8) and passing touchdowns (13) in the NFL.

After the departure of defensive coordinator Wade Phillips, Woods was chosen to be promoted to defensive coordinator for the 2017 season. Denver finished first in the NFL in pass defense in both 2015 (199.6 ypg) and 2016 (185.8) with Woods coaching the team's defensive backs. All four of Denver's starting defensive backs made at least one Pro Bowl playing for Woods from 2015 to 2016, including cornerbacks Chris Harris Jr. (2015-16) and Aqib Talib (2015-16), who were also named first-team All-Pro selections by the Associated Press in 2016. Safeties T. J. Ward (2015) and Darian Stewart (2016) also earned Pro Bowl recognitions while playing for Woods. 

In Woods’ first season as defensive coordinator in 2017, the Broncos finished third in the NFL in total defense, giving up just 290.0 yards per game. The Broncos’ fifth-ranked run defense in 2017 was particularly impressive as it improved by more than 40 yards per game after finishing 28th in the NFL in 2016.

San Francisco 49ers

In January 2019, the San Francisco 49ers hired Joe Woods as defensive back coach and passing game coordinator.

Cleveland Browns

On February 7, 2020, Woods was hired by the Cleveland Browns as their defensive coordinator under head coach Kevin Stefanski. He was fired on January 9, 2023.

References

External links
 New Orleans Saints bio

1970 births
Living people
American football defensive backs
Cleveland Browns coaches
Denver Broncos coaches
Eastern Michigan Eagles football coaches
Grand Valley State Lakers football coaches
Hofstra Pride football coaches
Illinois State Redbirds football players
Kent State Golden Flashes football coaches
Minnesota Vikings coaches
Muskingum Fighting Muskies football coaches
National Football League defensive coordinators
New Orleans Saints coaches
Northwestern State Demons football coaches
Oakland Raiders coaches
People from Armstrong County, Pennsylvania
Players of American football from Pennsylvania
Sportspeople from the Pittsburgh metropolitan area
Tampa Bay Buccaneers coaches
Western Michigan Broncos football coaches